Minfeld is a municipality in the district of Germersheim, in Rhineland-Palatinate, Germany.

Sons and daughters of the community
 Johann Casimir Häffelin (1737-1827), bishop, cardinal, Bavarian Minister of the Holy See, diplomat

Personalities who have worked on the ground
 Karl Friedrich Scholler (1810-1863), theologian, writer and politician, from 1858 vice dean in Minfeld, died there
 Clemens Nagel (born 1945), politician (SPD), from 1984 to 2004 local mayor, member of the Landtag of Rhineland-Palatinate 1975-2001
 Pascal Ackermann (born 1994), cyclist

References
 

Germersheim (district)